is a 1994 Japanese film directed by Junji Sakamoto.

Awards and nominations
16th Yokohama Film Festival 
Won: Best Film
Won: Best Director - Junji Sakamoto
Won: Best Supporting Actor - Kōichi Satō

References

1994 films
Films directed by Junji Sakamoto
1990s Japanese-language films
1990s Japanese films